The J Award of 2016 is the twelfth annual J Awards, established by the Australian Broadcasting Corporation's youth-focused radio station Triple J. The announcement comes at the culmination of Ausmusic Month (November). For the third year, four awards were presented; Australian Album of the Year, Double J Artist of the Year, Australian Music Video of the Year and Unearthed Artist of the Year.

The eligible period took place between November 2015 and October 2016. The winners were announced live on air on Triple J on Tuesday 17 November 2016.

Awards

Australian Album of the Year

Double J Artist of the Year

Australian Video of the Year

Unearthed Artist of the Year

References

2016 in Australian music
2016 music awards
J Awards